Two ships of the United States Navy have been named USS Ethan Allen in honor of Ethan Allen, the guerrilla leader of the Green Mountain Boys.
 The first  was a bark that raided the Confederate States of America during the American Civil War.
 The second  was the lead ship of her class of ballistic missile submarine that served during the Cold War.

Similar named
 SS Ethan Allen was a Liberty ship laid down by Bath Iron Works 7 January 1942, launched 16 August 1942 and scrapped 1960..

United States Navy ship names